Salda is a genus of shore bugs in the family Saldidae. There are about 18 described species in Salda.

Species
These 18 species belong to the genus Salda:

References

Further reading

 
 
 
 
 
 
 

Heteroptera genera
Saldidae